Tumlin-Wykień  is a village in the administrative district of Gmina Miedziana Góra, within Kielce County, Świętokrzyskie Voivodeship, in south-central Poland.

The village has a population of 688.

References

Villages in Kielce County